The Ukrainian Cup is an association football national knockout cup competition run by the Ukrainian Association of Football. The competition is conducted almost exclusively among professional clubs. Since the 2003–04 season, the Cup winner qualifies to play the Ukrainian Premier League winner for the Ukrainian Super Cup.

Current format
The format of this competition consists of two stages: a qualification stage with two rounds followed by the main event (four rounds and the final game). The competition involves all professional clubs plus the two finalists of the Ukrainian Amateur Cup (since 2011).

Past variations of the competition involved a home-away type of elimination, but the Ukrainian Cup has since changed to a single game per round format. In recent years, a conditional replay game was introduced to avoid penalty shootouts. Cup draws may be conducted for two consecutive rounds, but usually occur before each following round. The lower division teams are usually awarded the home-field advantage (or the first leg at home in case of a two-leg round).

Organization

Ukrainian Football Amateur Association
The modern Ukrainian Cup competition is primarily limited to professional level clubs. Prior to 1996, however, the Cup was open to cup winners of all Ukrainian regional teams. In 1996, amateur clubs were omitted from participation in the Ukrainian Cup. In 1997 and 1998, only winners of the Ukrainian Amateur Cup were allowed to participate. In 1999, a new tournament, the Ukrainian Second League Cup, was established; with that change, amateur clubs were excluded from the Ukrainian Cup competition. In 2006, amateur clubs once again were allowed to compete by qualifying as the winner of the Amateur Cup. Since 2011, both finalists have qualified for the Ukrainian Cup.

Professional clubs
From the Round of 32, which is officially considered to be the first round of competition, the tournament is administrated by the Ukrainian Premier League (PFL, created in 2008). Earlier rounds are under the administration of the PFL Ukraine. Until the organization of the PFL in 1996, the tournament and league competitions were both administered by the Football Federation of Ukraine.

History

Ukrainian Cup competitions have been conducted since at least 1936. The first of season in 1936 was officially known as Spring Championship, the decision about which was adopted by the All-Ukrainian football Section. Initially called also as the Spring Championship, sometime during the 1937 season the tournament was renamed by mass media as the Cup of the Ukrainian SSR (Kubok URSR). The official change was adopted by the Republican Football Conference only in April 1938. To commemorate the event, in 1979 the Soviet Ministry of Communication released an envelope with depiction of the trophy (see the picture). The streamer on top of a picture
reads in Russian language "The first Cup of Ukraine in football" (Pervyi kubok Ukrainy po futbolu), while the same thing is written at the picture's footer in Ukrainian language (Perhyi kubok Ukrayiny z futbolu).

In 1944 as compensation for the canceled republican championship there was conducted next tournament in September. The decision to conduct the tournament was adopted on 6 September 1944 by the Central Committee of the Communist Party of Ukraine. The tournament was also known as Ukrainian Cup or Ukrainian Bowl (Kelykh URSR). After World War II, subsequent editions of the national Cup were downgraded to a republican cup competition that was limited to lower league clubs and teams participating in the KFK competitions (amateurs). The timeframe of the tournament also shifted from spring time to fall (end of calendar year). Already in 1948 FC Lokomotyv Kharkiv as one of the Soviet Top League clubs from Ukraine chose not to participate in the Ukrainian Cup competition. In 1959 the tournament was cancelled completely and replaced with Football Cup among collective of physical culture (a predecessor to Ukrainian Amateur Cup). 

In 1970s the Ukrainian Cup competitions were revived and conducted parallel to Ukrainian Amateur Cup for several seasons. In second half of 1970 the tournament was discontinued once again until 1990.

The first Cup competition in independent Ukraine had an unlikely winner, similar to the championship of 1992. The main contender, Dynamo Kyiv, settled for a draw in its first game at home against a team that was an amateur club in Soviet times, Skala Stryi. In the following quarter-finals round, the team faced defeat by Torpedo Zaporizhia. Eventually that competition was won by Chornomorets Odesa.

In 2008, the Football Federation of Ukraine signed a contract with the company Datagroup, naming the company as the main sponsor of the tournament for the next four years. Datagroup introduced its new version of the cup trophy, the first winner of which became Shakhtar Donetsk. In 2010, there was an attempt to launch an independent website for the competition, which was active for only a couple of months.

Venues

The Ukrainian Cup finals are played most often at the main countries association football venue, Olympiyskiy National Sports Complex. Since 2008 and establishing of the Ukrainian Premier League, the final games started to be conducted at alternative stadiums among which most often was used the Metalist Oblast Sports Complex and the Dnipro Arena.

 18– Olimpiyskiy National Sports Complex, Kyiv
 5 – Metalist Oblast Sports Complex, Kharkiv
 2 – Dnipro-Arena, Dnipro
 2 – Arena Lviv, Lviv
 1 – Yuvileiny Stadium, Sumy
 1 – Oleksiy Butovsky Vorskla Stadium, Poltava
 1 – Slavutych Arena, Zaporizhia
 1 – Roman Shukhevych Ternopil city stadium, Ternopil

Finals
Source:

Top scorers of finals

Performances
Achievements of clubs since 1992

All-time table

Top-10. All figures are correct through the 2017–18 season.

Competition people

Managers

Players

See also 
Football in Ukraine
Ukrainian Premier League

Notes

References

External links 

Football Federation of Ukraine 
Ukrainian Cup 
Ukraine - Cup Finals. RSSSF 
Comprehensive information on all official cup tournaments in Ukraine (1992-2007). ukrainianfootball. 
Ukrainian Cup. Ukrainian Football from Dmytro Troshchiy. 
How the FFU works: the Ukrainian Cup is already two years as broken (Как работает ФФУ: Кубок Украины уже два года как поломан). Dinamo.Kyiv. 11 May 2018
Banyas, V. It is logical to unite in one competition a cup and a championship («…Логічно об’єднати в розіграші Кубка й чемпіонату…»). Ukrainian Premier League. 9 February 2018

 
1
Ukraine
Recurring sporting events established in 1992
1992 establishments in Ukraine